The New Joint Endeavor for Welfare, Education, and Liberation, or New JEWEL Movement (NJM), was a Marxist–Leninist vanguard party in the Caribbean island nation of Grenada that was led by Maurice Bishop. 

Established in 1973, the NJM issued its manifesto prior to the granting of independence to Grenada in 1974. The movement took control of the country with a successful bloodless revolution in 1979 and ruled by decree as the People's Revolutionary Government until 1983. In 1983, Bishop was killed by paramilitaries affiliated with hard-liners in his own party. This led to a military government, which was deposed by the US military in a 1983 invasion.

Origin 
The New JEWEL Movement (NJM) was formally established on 11 March 1973 as an alliance of the Joint Endeavor for Welfare, Education, and Liberation (JEWEL), Organization for Revolutionary Education and Liberation, and the Movement for Assemblies of the People (MAP), led by young lawyer Maurice Bishop. The NJM's initial manifesto was largely drafted by MAP's major intellectual, Franklyn Harvey, who had been heavily influenced by the writings of C.L.R. James. From 1973 to 1979, the NJM was an opposition political party active in Grenada. During the 1970s, the political situation in Grenada became increasingly polarized and violent. For the 1976 general elections the organisation formed an electoral coalition known as the People's Alliance with the Grenada National Party and the United People's Party. However, the alliance lost to the ruling Grenada United Labour Party in elections which were branded fraudulent by international observers. In the late 1970s, the NJM formed the National Liberation Army (NLA), also known as "the 12 Apostles".

Revolution 
In 1979, the NJM launched a revolution against the government of Eric Gairy while he was out of the country. The NJM gained control of the military barracks, radio station, government buildings and police stations in the country. Maurice Bishop then suspended the constitution and announced that the NJM was now a provisional revolutionary government, the People's Revolutionary Government, with himself as Prime Minister. After the revolution, the NJM described itself as a Marxist–Leninist vanguard party. The party did not consider itself to be a communist party because it believed that neither the NJM nor Grenada had reached a level of development where it would be possible to achieve communism. The NJM pursued policies to reach a point where a communist party could be formed, but considered itself to be unready due to the party not being led by a proletarian class and due to the low level of education in Marxist–Leninist politics.

Shortly after taking power, the government looked to Cuba for assistance because Bishop had been refused aid and a meeting with American President Ronald Reagan. Cuban construction workers were brought in to assist in the construction of a new international airport. The new government formed the People's Revolutionary Army, granting them "the powers of arrest and search as are vested in the members of the Royal Grenada Police Force."

The leaders of the U.S. government, and several other Caribbean nations, expressed discontent over the NJM government, such as its relations with Cuba and alleged military expansion.

Bishop's fall and the American invasion 
In 1983, a dispute developed within the NJM. Bishop's critics, led by deputy prime minister Bernard Coard, attempted to convince him to enter into a power-sharing agreement with Coard, wherein they would be co-equal leaders of the country. Bishop rejected this idea, and the split at the top level of the NJM led to serious political problems within the party and the government. Eventually, Coard ordered Bishop put under house arrest.

The removal of Bishop led to demonstrations in various parts of the country. The demonstrations grew to a point where Bishop was eventually freed. In unclear circumstances, Bishop made his way to the army headquarters. Eventually a military force from elsewhere in Grenada arrived at the headquarters and fighting broke out. Many civilians were killed. Bishop, along with government ministers, Fitzroy Bain, Nelson Steele (George), Norris Bain, Evelyn Bullen, the reportedly pregnant Jacqueline Creft, Keith Hayling, Evelyn Maitland, and Unison Whiteman were lined up in a courtyard against a wall for a considerable period of time. They were then executed by a firing squad.

Bishop's execution was followed by the formation of a military government under Hudson Austin. Austin announced a four-day total curfew under which anyone who left their home without authorization for any reason would be subject to summary execution. Six days later, the United States invaded Grenada and overthrew the government. With the removal of the NJM government, the former Grenadian constitution re-entered force.

Seventeen political and military officials of the military government (the Grenada 17) were later tried and convicted of being responsible for the deaths of Bishop and the other seven executed persons.

Foreign policy 
The New Jewel Movement worked closely with Cuba to provide assistance to left-wing revolutionary movements such as the South West African People's Organization (SWAPO) in South-West Africa and the Farabundo Martí National Liberation Front (FMLN) in El Salvador.

References

External links 
 Shalini Puri, The Grenada Revolution in the Caribbean Present: Operation Urgent Memory
 The Lost Bishop Photos
 The Grenada Revolution Online – Revolutionary Slogans

Communist parties in Grenada
Political parties in Grenada
Political parties established in 1973
Political parties disestablished in 1983
1973 establishments in Grenada
1983 disestablishments in Grenada
Formerly ruling communist parties